Setalimorphus is a genus of beetles in the family Carabidae, containing the following species:

 Setalimorphus punctiventris Sloane, 1895
 Setalimorphus regularis Sloane, 1910

References

Pterostichinae